Pitsea is a small town and former civil parish, now in the unparished area of Basildon, in south Essex, England. It comprises five sub-districts: Eversley, Northlands Park Neighbourhood (previously known as Felmores), Chalvedon, Pitsea Mount and Burnt Mills. It is part of the new town of Basildon. In 1931 the parish had a population of 3414.

During the creation of the new town of Basildon in the late 1940s and early 1950s, "Pitsea", "Vange" and "Laindon" were considered as possible names for the new town. As Basildon village was central to the district, the town was eventually named "Basildon". Before the new town regeneration, Pitsea itself was made up of unbuilt plot lands and was regarded as underdeveloped and run down.

The Cinema Museum in London holds extensive home movies from the Jefree family of Pitsea in the 50's. Ref HMO353

History 
There is little known history about Pitsea but its earliest recorded name is Piceseia which was in 1086 and probably recorded as this in the Domesday Book. This has changed over the centuries to many variations of the name, including: Pichesey(e), Pikeseye, Pithesey, Petchesey(e), Pisseye, Pitchesey, Pissey, Pytsay, Pikeshay, Pitesey, Pitcheshey, Pytchey, Pitsey and finally to what it is now Pitsea. It is thought, however, that all the names are derived from the original meaning of Pics' Island, which refers specifically to the area now known as Pitsea Mount.

Chalvedon, which is part of Pitsea, has also been known under different guises. In its earliest form it was known as Chauendona meaning Calves Hill this was first recorded in 1119. Other names include: Chaluedona, Chaluedene, Calueden and Callwedone before it ended up being Chalvedon. Great Chalvedon Hall still stands, now operating as a pub, and was completed some time in the 16th century. During the building of the new town Chalvedon became a housing estate in the west of Pitsea and the local secondary school had taken that name (now Basildon Academy - Chalvedon merged with Barstable School).

Pitsea was connected by the new London, Tilbury and Southend railway line in 1855. Next to the station is Cromwell Manor, previously Pitsea Hall, which dates from the 15th century. The arrival of the railway saw land around Pitsea bought and sold off piecemeal by companies like Protheroe and Morris of London who used tactics of free rail tickets and champagne auctions to convince East Londoners of the plotland dream. It was not until 1925 that planned development took place, when local entrepreneur Harold George Howard built The Railway Hotel (now demolished). He continued the development with The Broadway Cinema (closed in 1970 and re-opened as a bingo hall which itself closed 2009 - currently empty) in 1930, along with Tudor Chambers and Anne Boleyn Mansions (home to TSB Bank). He also built Howard Crescent and Park which still exist to this day. Also in 1925, the locally famous Pitsea market first opened.

Further major development of Pitsea did not take place until the 1960s when the new town redevelopment of Basildon took shape. Pitsea market was moved from its original location in Station Lane in 1969 to Howards Field, to make way for the construction of South Mayne. Pitsea was cut in half in the 1970s by the construction of the new A13 flyover (opened 1973), with Pitsea Mount separated from the rest of the town. In 1976 Pitsea's new town centre was opened along Northlands Pavement (previously Northlands Drive), with Sainsbury's being the anchor store along with a new office block called Pembroke House, and was quickly followed by the new Pitsea Swimming Pool (demolished 2013). In 1978 Tesco opened what was at the time the largest supermarket in Europe and would eventually become the first Tesco Extra store in 1997. Also in 1978 Pitsea Market moved for a second time, re-located behind the Railway Hotel and in front of the Sainsbury's Supermarket (the second market place became a car park).

In 1981 the Pitsea Centre opened - a leisure centre and library opposite the former pool. A new Leisure centre at Eversley opened in 1987. 1995 saw the opening of the Old Market Retail park on the second market place; part of this was destroyed by fire in 2006, to be rebuilt again in 2007. Sainsbury's supermarket moved outwards to Nethermayne, on the former sports ground of Carrera's cigarette factory.

Landmarks 

The most prominent landmark is the tower of the 13th-century church of St. Michael, situated on Pitsea Mount. The dominant position of the building over the local area has seen the church used as a station for a mobile telephone aerial. The nave of the church was demolished in 1998, as it was being vandalised and had fallen into disrepair since its deconsecration in 1983. The only remaining part is the tower.

Great Chalvedon Hall is a 16th-century home which Basildon council purchased in 1977. It is located in Tyefields and now operates as a pub. Pitsea Hall, now known as Cromwell Manor, is a 15th-century house next to Pitsea railway station.

Governance 
From 1894 to 1934, the Pitsea parish formed part of the Billericay Rural District. In 1934 it became part of the Billericay Urban District and in 1937 the parish was abolished and absorbed into a larger parish of Billericay. The district, consisting only of the Billericay parish, was renamed Basildon Urban District in 1955. In 2010, the district became part of the Borough of Basildon. In terms of parliamentary representation, the area was included in the Basildon parliamentary constituency. Since the 2010 general election Pitsea is represented as part of the South Basildon and East Thurrock parliamentary constituency, the MP being Stephen Metcalfe of the Conservative Party.

Regeneration
The regeneration of Pitsea town centre started in 2010. The Station Lane redevelopment was completed in 2012, and is a prominent landmark that can be seen for miles on approach to Pitsea. A large L-shaped building, it comprises five ground-floor retail units, 121 flats (mixture of social and private housing), and resident parking for 126 cars and 109 bikes and forms a new linkway between Pitsea Broadway and Tesco.

In May 2013, The Railway Hotel public house was pulled down, as the Fortune of War pub had been.  The Pitsea Swimming Pool was pulled down in January 2013.  A new market square has been put onto the site of the former Railway Hotel, officially opening in 2014. The former co-op store (closed early 1980s) that had hosted an arcade and several independent business was demolished in early 2014, and by July 2014 a new Aldi was built on this site and part of the former market place. The rest of the former market place has been converted into parking.

The former Sainsbury's building that had hosted Aldi and Castaways, a fish restaurant, were knocked down and replaced by a 70,000 sq ft store which was to be occupied by Morrisons in Spring 2015. However, due to the downturn in the supermarket business Morrisons pulled out of the deal, and The Range chain opened their new store in the building in July 2016.

Sport 
Pitsea is the home of semi-professional football clubs Bowers & Pitsea and Hashtag United. They both play at Crown Avenue, known formally as the Len Salmon Stadium. Bowers & Pitsea also have many youth teams playing in the local area.

Other sporting clubs in Pitsea include Eversley Park Cricket Club, Basildon & Pitsea Cricket Club, Chalvedon Football Club, Chalvedon Boys Football Club, Chalvedon Boys Amateur Boxing Club, Pitsea Running Club, and numerous Sunday League junior and men's football teams. Most of these teams can be found playing locally on a Sunday at various points across Pitsea, including Eversley Recreation Ground and Pitsea School. Chalvedon Boys since rebranded to Fryens and Beech United is known as the superior team. Notable superstars from the team: Alfie Hyland, Oliver Titheradge, Shay Massey

Northlands Park is a large open space in Pitsea and is home to two large fishing lakes regularly used by anglers. The lake holds bream, carp, eel, perch, pike, roach, rudd and tench.

Education  
 Basildon Academies
 Northlands Infant & Junior School
 Briscoe Infant & Junior School
 Eversley County Primary School
 Felmore Infant & Junior School
 St Margarets Church of England School
 Pitsea Infant & Junior School
 Northlands Park Children's Centre - Funded by Sure Start

Located in Burnt Mills Road is the Basildon Information and Technology Education Centre (ITEC). The centre provides both day and night courses in computer IT and design and technology for both school leavers and adults. It was once an infant and junior school for the local area called Nevendon Infant and Junior School, but due to other schools opening in the area, pupil numbers declined and the school eventually closed.

Essex County Council's Adult Community Learning service operated a satellite centre at Briscoe School in Felmores End until 2016, in addition to the main centre located at Ely House at Churchill Way in Fryerns.

Transport
Pitsea is served by Pitsea railway station on the c2c line from London to Southend.

Local bus services are the 1, 5, 8, 12, 21, 22 and 28 that operate from Pitsea Broadway to the nearby towns of Basildon, Canvey, Southend by First Essex, Arriva Southend and Stephensons.

The town is served by the Pitsea bypass of the A13, which connects London to Southend, and has a direct link to the M25. To the east is the A130 to Canvey Island or Chelmsford, and also links to the A12 to London or East Anglia. To the north is the A127 which serves the same purpose as the A13, and to the west is the A132 which is the border which separates Pitsea from Barstable and Vange; this road links into Basildon town centre, the A127 and Wickford.

Employment
Most people living in Pitsea commute to either Basildon, Southend or London for employment.

Pitsea has a fair amount of office spaces as well, which can be found in Pembroke House in the main Pitsea Centre, Broadway Chambers in the main Pitsea Broadway, and Tudor Chambers located in Station Lane. The offices include solicitors, insurance companies, an accounting software company and an employment agency.

To the north of Pitsea is the Burnt Mills Industrial Estate which has many industrial units, including freight delivery, printing, a car wreck yard and a small amount of manufacturing, including Gardner Aerospace. Also in this area is the main delivery depot for the courier T.N.T. The area also has the main sewage treatment works which during the summer has reportedly been the cause of a nasty stink, although Essex and Suffolk Water deny there is anything wrong with it. Also further along from there is the main local depot for the cable TV company Telewest Blueyonder, which came to the area in the early 1990s under the name of United Artists before changing its name to Telewest and then more recently to Virgin Media. This previously had been the main customer service centre for United Artists.

Local issues
In the land between the sewage treatment works and the Hovefields Industrial Park, there have been ongoing talks of building a large incinerator, much to the town residents' disagreement. This has led to local disapproval with petitions having been signed and handed to the government. The fumes which would be churned out by the chimneys on the incinerator and what effect they could have on local people's health were the main concerns. However, after agreement between Essex County Council, Balfour Beatty and Urbaser building work started in 2013 and the plant opened in 2015.

Pitsea Tip has been in operation throughout the 20th century on the Pitsea Marshes. It has been reputedly the source of a nasty smell which affects both Pitsea and Canvey Island, although scientific evidence completed on behalf of the landfill operator Veolia proved inconclusive.

In 2013 it was announced that developers wanted to build a new village on land in between Pitsea and Bowers Gifford. The development was being put forward by Meridian Strategic Land but was plainly rejected in September 2013, as it did not fall within the town plan. Meridian raised an appeal to the Government Inspector, and an outcome is due late 2014.

Notable people
 Scott Robinson, singer with 5ive
 QBoy, UK's leading gay rapper
 Michael Kightly footballer with Southend United F.C., Wolverhampton Wanderers F.C., Stoke City F.C. and Burnley F.C.
James Tomkins footballer with West Ham United F.C. and Crystal Palace F.C.

References

External links
 Basildon Borough History - Pitsea
 Old photos of Pitsea
 Pitsea Town Centre masterplan

Populated places in Essex
Former civil parishes in Essex
Basildon (town)